The Socialist Democratic Vanguard Party (PADS) is a political party in Morocco.

History and profile
The party was founded in principle in 1991, after having previously emerged as a faction within the USFP named Socialist Union of Popular Forces – National Administrative Commission in 1983. The foundation was formalised in December 1993.

In the parliamentary election, held on 7 September 2007, the party was part of the PADS–CNI–PSU Union, that won 6 seats. The party is currently a member of the Federation of the Democratic Left, a successor entity of that alliance.

References

1991 establishments in Morocco
Democratic socialist parties in Africa
Political parties established in 1991
Political parties in Morocco
Socialist parties in Morocco